Everhart is a surname. Notable people with the surname include:

 Angie Everhart, American actress and former fashion model
 Forrest E. Everhart, United States Army soldier and a recipient of the Medal of Honor
 Isaiah Fawkes Everhart (1840–1911), American physician and naturalist
 James Bowen Everhart, Republican member of the U.S. House of Representatives from Pennsylvania
 Nathan Everhart (born 1988), American professional wrestler better known as Jason Jordan
 Rex Everhart (1920–2000), American actor
 Ron Everhart, American college basketball coach 
 Thomas Eugene Everhart, American educator and physicist
 William Everhart, member of the U.S. House of Representatives
 Zack Everhart, Top 4 Season 11, So You Think You Can Dance

See also
 2664 Everhart
 Everhart Museum
 Everhart-Thornley detector